Basement is a 2014 horror film directed by Topel Lee. The film is a joint project by Coffee House Productions and Springboard Film Productions and will be distributed by GMA Pictures. The film was released on February 12, 2014, serving it as the Valentine offering movie of GMA Network' Pictures.

Synopsis

A group of people gets stuck in a basement parking for the night. At the onset, some are irritated and just can't wait to go home, while some don't even give a damn, knowing they can easily come out the next day. But when the power is shut off and as it gets close to midnight, strange things start to happen.

It all starts with one death. Followed by another and another. They don't really witness the killings, but they hear the screaming, and they see the bloodied bodies thereafter, making them fear for their lives.

As the night unfolds, they soon realize they're not dealing with an ordinary being. There's an evil creature stuck inside the basement with them. But what kind of creature is this? And how can they fight it?

Cast
Betong Sumaya as Bernard
Alvin Aragon as Parley
Carl Acosta as GJ
Chynna Ortaleza as Angela
Dex Quindoza as Lui
Dion Ignacio as Mendoza
Ellen Adarna as the victim
Enzo Pineda as Jules
Jan Manual as Migs
Kevin Santos as Mang Mario
Kristofer Martin as Macoy
Louise delos Reyes as Roxy
Mona Louise Rey as Anna
Pilita Corrales as Lola Meding
RJ Padilla as Dondie
Sarah Lahbati as Eliza
Teejay Marquez as Ryan
Anton Ferrer
Aljur Abrenica

Production

Filming
Topel Lee said the film was ten years in the making because of the CG (computer graphics) requirements.

References

External links
 
 

2014 films
Philippine supernatural horror films
Filipino-language films
GMA Pictures films
Films directed by Topel Lee